The 2015–16 season was Hull City's first season back in the Football League Championship following their relegation from the Premier League last season in their 112th year in existence. Along with the Championship, the club competed in the FA Cup and Football League Cup. The season covers the period from 1 July 2015 to 30 June 2016.

Events
 On 3 July 2015 Tom Ince was sold to Derby County for £4.75 million.
On 11 July 2015, the Football Supporters Federation confirmed that a 70/30 decision was made in favour of Hull City A.F.C. not changing their name after The Football Association vote.
 On 27 July 2015 Sam Clucas was signed on a 3-year contract from Chesterfield for an undisclosed fee, reported by the Hull Daily Mail as about £1.3 million.
 On 27 July 2015 Ryan Taylor was signed on a 1-year deal after being released by Newcastle United.
 On 29 July 2015 James Chester was sold to West Bromwich Albion  for an undisclosed fee, reported by the BBC as £8 million.
 On 29 July 2015 Robbie Brady moved to Norwich City for a fee of  £7 million.
 On 31 July 2015 Isaac Hayden was brought in on a season-long loan from Arsenal, though this was terminated,  by mutual consent, following the Queens Park Rangers match on 1 January 2016. Though he remained available for selection until another opportunity became available.
 On 4 August 2015 Chuba Akpom was brought in on a season-long loan from Arsenal.
 On 7 August 2015, Moses Odubajo joined on a 3-year deal from Brentford for a fee of £3.5 million.
 On 10 August 2015 Dame N'Doye was sold to Trabzonspor  for £2.2 million.
 On 10 August 2015 goalkeeper Rory Watson moved to Scunthorpe United on a month-long loan spell.
 On 27 August 2015 Shaun Maloney as signed from Chicago Fire on a two-year deal for an undisclosed fee.
 On transfer deadline day, 1 September 2015, Nikica Jelavić moved to West Ham United for £3 million, and was replaced by Adama Diomande on a 3-year deal from Stabæk for an undisclosed fee.
 On 10 September 2015 the club revoked the suspension of Jake Livermore after  a disciplinary hearing decided that the Football Association provisional ban, for  testing positive for cocaine, would not be extended,
 On 12 October 2015 Conor Townsend signed a month-long loan deal with Grimsby Town, which was extended until 1 January 2016 on 5 November 2015.
On 9 November 2015, Will Aimson joined League One side Blackpool on a one-month loan deal, this was later extended to 9 January 2016.
 On 2 January 2016, Calaum Jahraldo-Martin joined Leyton Orient on a one-month loan deal, this was later extended to the end of the 2015–16 season.
On 6 January 2016 Conor Townsend moved to Scunthorpe United on a free transfer.
On 7 January 2016 goalkeeper Allan McGregor signed a two-year extension to his contract with the club.
On 14 January 2016, following a loan spell,  Will Aimson signed a two-and-a-half-year contract with Blackpool for an undisclosed fee.
On 15 January 2016 Matty Dixon signed an 18-month deal with York City.
On 22 January 2016 midfielder David Meyler signed a two-year extension to his contract with the club.
On transfer dead-line day, 1 February 2016, goalkeeper Dušan Kuciak was signed on an 18-month contract from Legia Warsaw for an undisclosed fee. Also  Nick Powell was brought in on-loan, from Manchester United, until the end of the season.
On 5 February 2016 Steve Bruce was named Championship Manager of the Month for January and Abel Hernández was named Championship Player of the month.
 On 9 February 2016 Greg Luer moved to Scunthorpe United on a month-long loan. After his return he moved on 12 March 2016 for another month-long loan this time at Stevenage, which was later extended to the end of the 2015–16 season.
 On 16 March 2016 Curtis Davies signed a 2-year extension to his contract with the club.
 On 16 March 2016 the club announced a new Season Membership Scheme for the 2016–17 season that would replace season tickets.
On 25 March 2016 Cambridge United signed Max Clark on loan until the end of the 2015–16 season. On 30 June 2016 he signed a further six-month loan deal with Cambridge United.
 On 12 May 2016 Hull City announced the signing of Jonathan Edwards on a one-year contract after a successful trial with the club's U21 squad.
 On 2 June at the 2016 Stadium Events and Hospitality Awards, the club took two awards, the Matchday Hospitality Award (Medium Stadium) and the Overall Matchday Hospitality Award.
 On 2 June 2016, it was announced that Sone Aluko and Ryan Taylor would leave the club prior to their contract expiry and that Eldin Jakupović would have an additional year with the club.
 On 23 June 2016 Ahmed Elmohamady signed a 3-year extension to his contract.
 On 24 June 2016 Eldin Jakupović signed a new 2-year deal with the club rather than take the option of a 1-year extension of his existing contract.

Players

First team squad

Out on loan

Transfers

Transfers in

Total spending:  £4,800,000

Transfers out

Total income:  £24,950,000

Loans in

Loans out

Pre-season
On 9 June 2015, Hull City announced three pre-season friendlies against North Ferriby United, Chesterfield and Sheffield United. On 18 June 2015, the club announced their confirmed fixtures for the pre-season trip to Austria.

The Tigers had a pre-season training camp in Portugal from 6 July 2015.

Competition

Overall

Championship

League table

Results summary

Result by matchday

Matches
On 17 June 2015, the fixtures for the season were announced.

Football League play-offs
As a result of Hull finishing in fourth place in the Championship they qualified for the Football League play-offs. In the play-off semi finals Hull played against fifth placed team Derby County over two legs. The first leg was held on 14 May 2016 at Derby's Pride Park. Hull's top scorer Abel Hernández was the first to score with a strike from 25 yards after half an hour. This was followed 10 minutes later with a shot by Moses Odubajo deflected in by defender Jason Shackell. Andrew Robertson completed the scoring with a late stoppage time goal to give Hull a 3–0 advantage going into the second leg at the KC Stadium on 17 May 2016. Derby got off to a great start with a goal from close range by Johnny Russell after 7 minutes. Their lead was doubled when a sliced ball by  Andrew Robertson went into his own net 30 minutes later. Derby continued to press but Hull hung on to deny them any further scores. The match ended 2–0 to Derby, but Hull progressed 3–2 on aggregate, much to the relief of manager Steve Bruce who was in charge for the 200th time. The final, on 28 May 2016 at Wembley Stadium, was a local derby against Sheffield Wednesday who beat Brighton & Hove Albion 3–1 on aggregate in the other semi-final. Hull beat Sheffield Wednesday 1–0 in the final with the only goal coming from a 25-yard wonder strike by Mohamed Diamé in the 72nd minute. The Tigers made an immediate return to the top flight and it was Bruce's fourth promotion to the Premier League as manager.

League Cup

On 16 June 2015, the first round draw was made, and Hull City were drawn away against Accrington Stanley. The match took place on 11 August 2015 at the Crown Ground with neither team managing to score during normal time. In extra time both teams scored twice leaving the game to be determined by penalties which Hull won 4–3. In the second round, Hull City were handed a home tie against Rochdale. The match was played on 25 August 2015 and Greg Luer put Hull in front after 9 minutes with the only goal of the game. The third round draw was made on 25 August 2015 live on Sky Sports by Charlie Nicholas and Phil Thompson. Hull City were drawn at home to Swansea City. The match took place on
22 September 2015 with the first-half seeing several attempts by both teams. It was not until the 41st minute that David Meyler broke the deadlock by scoring what turned out to be the only goal of the match. The draw for the fourth round took place on 23 September 2015 and Hull were again drawn at home this time to Leicester City. The match took place on 27 October 2015 at the KC Stadium and the game remained goalless at full-time. Ten minutes into extra-time Riyad Mahrez put Leicester in front, but they were pegged back five minutes later through substitute Abel Hernández, to take the match into a penalty-shootout. City scored all of their shots while Leicester only scored four as Riyad Mahrez attempt was saved by Eldin Jakupovic. This took Hull through to their first ever quarter-final appearance in the League Cup. The quarter-final draw took place the following day and Hull were drawn away to Manchester City. The match took place on 1 December 2015 at the City of Manchester Stadium. Manchester opened the scoring 12 minutes into the game when Wilfried Bony scored from a rebound off the post. That remained the only goal until 10 minutes from the end when Kelechi Iheanacho put Manchester two up. Minutes later Kevin De Bruyne capitalised on a poor back header from Andrew Robertson to put the home team 3–0 up. De Bruyne scored again, minutes later, from an edge of the area free-kick leaving Hull to get a consolation goal through  Robertson in extra-time. The result was a 4–1 defeat or City in their first ever quarter-final appearance. On a bright note for Hull, the match saw the return from injury of Robert Snodgrass when he came on as a replacement for Sone Aluko in the 73rd minute.

FA Cup

Hull entered the FA Cup competition in the Third round the draw for which the took place on 7 December 2015 and Hull were drawn at home to follow Championship side Brighton & Hove Albion. The match took place on 9 January 2016. In the 40th minute of the match Lewis Dunk fouled Harry Maguire in the box to give Hull a penalty. Robert Snodgrass took the penalty to score his first goal for the club. Brighton's Andrew Crofts shot in extra-time rebounded off the cross-bar to give Hull the victory 1–0. The draw for the fourth round took place on 11 January 2015 and Hull were drawn away to the winner of the Bury and Bradford City third round match. The replay took place on 19 January 2016 and the match remained goalless after extra-time, but Bury took the match 4–2 on penalties. Thus Hull played Bury on 30 January 2016 at Gigg Lane, Bury. The match was played in difficult weather conditions, with Steve Bruce making 11 changes to the squad that played at Fulham in the league, including a first senior start for youngster Josh Tymon. Bury started the best, but after 14 minutes David Meyler broke through only to see his shot blocked by Ian Lawlor, Chuba Akpom was on-hand to net the rebound. After the break, there was chances for both sides before Sone Aluko was brought down in the box, and Akpom was given the opportunity to take the spot-kick to score his second of the match. Ten minutes later Akpom netted his hat-trick leaving Craig Jones to score a late consolation goal for Bury. The draw for the fifth round took place on 31 January 2016 and Hull were drawn away to Arsenal, the third year in a row the clubs had faced each other in the competition. The match took place on 20 February 2016 at the Emirates Stadium. City made ten changes from the previous league game but failed to make any inroads into the Arsenal defence. Arsenal had a number of chances but could not make a breakthrough, as Eldin Jakupović pulled off some spectacular saves to maintain a clean-sheet. The game finished 0–0 and a replay at the KC Stadium was to be arranged. The draw for the quarter-final took place the following day and the winner was drawn at home to Watford. The date for the Arsenal replay was later confirmed as 8 March 2016 with live coverage on BT Sport. The match kicked off at 7.00 p.m. and City matched Arsenal until just before the break when Olivier Giroud seized on a mistake by David Meyler to open the scoring. He went on to double Arsenal's lead halfway through the second-half before Theo Walcott got a brace of goals late in the game. Hull lost the match 4–0 giving Arsenal the victory for the third season in a row.

Statistics

Captains

Appearances

Note: Appearances shown after a "+" indicate player came on during course of match.

Disciplinary record

Top scorers

Kits
On 10 July 2015 it was announced that Flamingo Land would be the shirt sponsor for the season. The new home kit was revealed on 13 July 2015. The back of shirt sponsor was announced on 28 July 2015 as the local firm Hudgell Solicitors. The away kit was shown by boxer Luke Campbell before and after his fight in Hull against Tommy Coyle.

Awards

The annual awards was held on 3 May 2016.
Abel Hernández was named Player of the Year and Player's Player of the Year.
Robert Snodgrass was awarded Goal of the Season for his last minute strike against Wolverhampton Wanderers on 15 April 2016.
Josh Tymon was named the Academy Player of the Season.

Notes

References

2015-16
Hull City
2010s in Kingston upon Hull